Campylospermum serratum is a plant in the family Ochnaceae. The specific epithet  is from the Latin meaning "with teeth", referring to the leaf margin. It is found in Tropical Asia, from Sulawesi, Indonesia to Hainan, Zhōngguó/China and over to southwester India. Gomphia serrata was a previous common name for the species. The plant is used for it wood and its sap is used in folk medicine and in the past for teeth-blackening.

Description
The scaly bark is dark grey-brown. The long leaves (10-17 x 2–5.5 cm) are elliptic, with a cuneate base and, as per the species epithet, small teeth on the margin. The flowers, growing in a few groups along terminal inflorescences, are yellow or cream-coloured. The yellowish-green berry-like fruit are kidney-shaped and measure up to 14x18mm in size. Features that help to distinguish it form other species of Campylospermum include 6–14 cm long inflorescences; a few groups of flowers congested along the inflorescence branches; pedicel's basal portion below articulation is 1mm or less; obovate petals with slightly emarginate apex and an auriculate base; the secondary nerves closely curved to the margin of the leaf, with submarginal vein occurring at irregular distances from the leaf margin. In China|Zhōngguó/China the species tends to be 2.5 to 7m in height and flowers in July with fruit from August to December.

Taxonomy
The species was first described as Maesia serrata. Volker Bittrich and Maria do Carmo Estanislau do Amaral transferred it to the current genus, Campylospermum, in 1994.

Distribution
Campylospermum serratum occurs from Indonesia to Zhōngguó/China and India. Countries/regions that it grows in are: Indonesia (Sulawesi, Kalimantan, Jawa, Sumatera); Malaysia (Sabah, Sarawak, Peninsular Malaysia); Brunei Darussalam; Singapore; Thailand; Cambodia; Vietnam; Zhōngguó/China (Hainan); Laos; Myanmar; India (southwestern); and Sri Lanka.

Habitat
Its habitat is lowland to submontane forests, including mixed dipterocarp and kerangas forests, from sea-level to  altitude.
On the island of Langkawi, in the Machinchang Range, the plant occurs scattered in the understorey of the sandstone heath forest, at between 200 and 700m.
In mainland Southeast Asia it is often found in open formations alongside rivers.
On the Bokor Plateau of Preah Monivong Bokor National Park, Cambodia, the plant is a shrub or treelet occurring in evergreen forest and in the scrubland/stunted forest on sandy soil near the plateau top, 936-1056m, found at about 970m elevation.
In Zhōngguó/China it occurs in dense forest, along streams, in granitic areas and sometimes even on mountain summits; with an elevation range of 6-700m.

Ecology
The fruit are predated on by the red-vented barbet in the Loc Bac Forest of Lâm Đồng Province, Vietnam.

Vernacular names
The local/common names of the small tree include: mata ketam (Malaysia); ângkië chhmôôl, bâmpu:eng ruëng, chhiëm angtuëng (Khmer); 齿叶赛金莲木, chi ye sai jin lian mu (Chinese).

Uses
The red or brown-red wood splits easily, and is used for small construction works and as firewood. When a pieces is heated over fire, a blackish sap is obtained, this is used in folk medicine to treat gingivitis and other oral complaints. In Vietnam the stalks were used in the past to blacken teeth.

Further reading
Additional information can be got in the following:
Dy Phon, P. (2000). Dictionnaire des plantes utilisées au Cambodge: 1–915. chez l'auteur, Phnom Penh, Cambodia
Govaerts, R. (1999). World Checklist of Seed Plants 3(1, 2a & 2b): 1–1532. MIM, Deurne [species not accepted, cited as Gomphia serrata
Newman, M., Ketphanh, S., Svengsuksa, B., Thomas, P., Sengdala, K., Lamxay, V. & Armstrong, K. (2007). A checklist of the vascular plants of Lao PDR: 1–394. Royal Botanic Gardens, Edinburgh
Kress, W.J., DeFilipps, R.A., Farr, E. & Kyi, D.Y.Y. (2003). A Checklist of the Trees, Shrubs, Herbs and Climbers of Myanmar Contributions from the United States National Herbarium 45: 1–590. Smithsonian Institution
Toyama, H. & al. (2013). Inventory of the woody flora in Permanent plats of Kampong Thom and Kompong Chhnang provinces, Cambodia Acta Phytotaxonomica et Geobotanica 64: 45-105
Turner, I.M. (1995 publ. 1997). A catalogue of the Vascular Plants of Malaya Gardens' Bulletin Singapore 47(2): 347-655
Van Steenis, C.G.G.J. (ed.) (1971-1976). Flora Malesiana 7: 1–876. Noordhoff-Kolff N.V., Djakarta
Wu, Z., Raven, P.H. & Hong, D. (eds.) (2007). Flora of China 12: 1–534. Science Press (Beijing) & Missouri Botanical Garden Press (St. Louis)

References

serratum
Flora of Hainan
Flora of tropical Asia